Alexandroupoli Airport "Dimokritos" or "Democritus" (Greek: Κρατικός Αερολιμένας Αλεξανδρούπολης "Δημόκριτος", Kratikós Aeroliménas Alexandrúpolis "Dimókritos")  is an airport 7 km east of Alexandroupolis in northeastern Greece on main national road E90. It is located near the village of Apalos, which belongs to the municipality of Alexandroupoli. The airport was built in 1944. In 1955 it became an international airport whereas the current buildings and runway were constructed in 1975.

The airport was named after Democritus, the ancient philosopher born in Abdera.

Airlines and destinations

Statistics

2016 Turkish coup d'état attempt 

On Saturday 16 July 2016, at 11:42 am (UTC+2), a Turkish Black Hawk helicopter sent a distress signal and requested permission for an emergency landing to Greek authorities and landed 8 minutes later (11:50) at the airport after an unsuccessful coup in Turkey. Two Greek F-16s observed the procedure and escorted the helicopter to the airport. Eight Turkish military officers, who were on the helicopter, were arrested after landing. They were transferred to the local police station, while the helicopter was guarded at the airport by the Greek authorities. They were charged with illegal entry into the country. Seven were also charged of instigating illegal flight, while the eighth, who was piloting the helicopter, was accused of executing the illegal flight. The eight officers all requested political asylum in Greece. At night (after 11:00 p.m. (EEST) a second Turkish Black Hawk helicopter with extra crew members arrived at the Greek airport from Turkey in order to retrieve the first helicopter, after the crew checked the helicopter, both helicopters returned to Turkey early on the morning of 17 July.

See also
Transport in Greece

References

External links 
Hellenic Civil Aviation Authority

Airports in Greece
Transport infrastructure in Eastern Macedonia and Thrace
Buildings and structures in Evros (regional unit)